Tanishq Swarna Sangeetham (Karnaataka Sangeethathin Thanga Kuralukkaana Thedal) is a reality-based Indian singing competition in Tamil language that is being aired on Raj TV. The program seeks to discover the best singing talent in the Carnatic music genre, through a series of statewide auditions in South India. The contest is run for youngsters between the age group 15-23. The show is sponsored by the diamond and gold jewellery store, Tanishq, and the winner of the show is awarded 5 lakh rupees worth of jewellery from Tanishq. The show completed three seasons after its debut in 2012.

Permanent judges for the talent in season 3 are eminent vocalists Papanasam Ashok Ramani and Nithyasree Mahadevan. Guest judges who appeared in season 3 include other eminent vocalists such as M. Balamuralikrishna, Sudha Raghunathan, S. Sowmya, G. V. Prakash, Shakthisree Gopalan, and others. The show aired on weekends between 9:30pm and 10:30pm, and re-runs are telecast between 9:30am and 10:30am.

Season 3

Debut (season 1 and 2 recall series)

"Diamonds in the Crown" (Episode 1)
 Compere: Sreechitra
 Performances:

This episode telecast performances from previous seasons of the show where then-contestants sang compositions of the Trinity of Carnatic Music, Papanasam Sivan, and Subramania Bharathiyar.

"Golden Ambassadors" (Episode 2)
 Compere: Sreechitra
 Performances:

In each season, various prominent celebrity musicians appear on the show as special guest judges These musicians are invited to the show as golden ambassadors of the theme being promoted in each round of the competition. This episode telecast performances by the golden ambassadors in previous seasons of the show.

"Experiments with gold" (Episode 3)
 Compere: Sreechitra
 Performances:

Although the show started off as an experiment being one of the few reality TV show competitions dedicated to Carnatic music, the show also undertook experiments with other related genres for various rounds during each season of the competition. This episode telecast noteworthy performances by contestants (particularly less trained) who shone in rounds consisting of genres other than Carnatic music, being bhajan round, wedding songs round, fusion round, and Bharatha Natyam round.

"Ornamental gold" (Episode 4)
 Compere: Sreechitra
 Performances:

This episode telecast various excerpts of performances and information regarding six former contestants in earlier seasons of the show: the top three finalists in season 1, and the top three finalists in season 2 of the show.

Open audition rounds (episodes 5 to 10)
 Compere: Sreechitra

Final level audition - top 10 selection
 Compere: Sreechitra

50 contestants were selected during the open audition rounds. This round required the contestants to perform what was required by the permanent judges, Nithyasree Mahadevan and Papanasam Ashok Ramani.

Freestyle round

At the conclusion of this round, the top 10 contestants were selected for the main level competition.

Top 10 finalists

Finals

Trinity Round (episode 15)
 Compere: Sreechitra
 Permanent Judges: Nithyasree Mahadevan and Papanasam Ashok Ramani
 Guest Judge & Performer: N. Ravikiran
 Performances:

References

External links
 Raj TV Official Site 
  Raj TV on YouTube
 Raj Television Network

Raj TV television series
2012 Indian television series debuts
Singing talent shows
Indian reality television series